Being is an extremely broad concept encompassing objective and subjective features of reality and existence.

Being  may also refer to:

Grammar and linguistics
 Being, the present participle and gerund form of the English verb to be

Arts, entertainment, and media

Literature
 Being and Nothingness, a 1943 essay on phenomenological ontology by Jean-Paul Sartre
 Being and Time, a 1927 book by Martin Heidegger

Music
 Being (album), 1974 Wigwam album
 "Being" (Kotoko song)
 "Being" (Lali Esposito song)
 "Being", a song by Opshop, from the album You Are Here

Other uses in arts, entertainment, and media
 On Being, a public radio program about religion

Philosophy
 Being in itself, a term from 20th-century philosophy
 Category of being, the metaphysical classification of all beings
 Ego (religion), spiritual or religious "beingness"
 Great chain of being, the rationalist classification of all beings
 Human being
 Human beings in Buddhism
 Reference failure, a concept of Bertrand Russell involving fictional beings
 Sentient beings (Buddhism), a type of being
 Supreme Being, the highest in the hierarchy of beings

Other uses
 Being (company), Japanese company
 Digital being, an artificially intelligent machine
 Energy being, a fictional lifeform
 Liminal being, a fictional lifeform

See also
 Being Human (disambiguation)
 Ontology, the study of being
 Ousia, Greek for being